Hill City is an unincorporated community in southwestern Camas County, Idaho, United States.

It lies at the intersection of U.S. Route 20 with Mink and Swamp Roads and Trader Lane, 14 miles (22½ km) west-southwest of Fairfield, the county seat.

History
Hill City was named for the Bennet Mountain Hills, located nearby, and in 1911, Hill City became the a major station on the Oregon Short Line Railroad. From Hill City and the surrounding Camas Prairie, astonishing numbers of sheep were shipped. At one time, more sheep were shipped from Hill City than anywhere else in the world.

Hill City's population was 30 in 1960.

There were also many grain elevators in the area. There is a historic saloon, reopened in 2013. They sell basic food and local crafts.

The elevation of Hill City is 5090 feet (1551 m) above sea level.

References

See also
 Camas Prairie Centennial Marsh Wildlife Management Area

Unincorporated communities in Idaho
Unincorporated communities in Camas County, Idaho